Ayarna is a Ghanaian surname. Notable people with the surname include:

Imoru Ayarna ( 1917–2015), Ghanaian businessman and politician
Reuben Ayarna (born 1985), Ghanaian football midfielder

See also
 Ayarneh

Ghanaian surnames